Diphyus is a genus of parasitoid wasps belonging to the family Ichneumonidae.

The genus has almost cosmopolitan distribution.

Species:
 Diphyus adventor (Berthoumieu, 1892)
 Diphyus albicoxalis (Uchida, 1927)

References

Ichneumonidae
Ichneumonidae genera